Monaco is a sovereign city-state, country, and microstate on the French Riviera, along the Mediterranean coast. The country has long been under the control of the Grimaldi family, who have encouraged musical development. Prince Rainier III introduced the Prince Rainier III Prize for Musical Composition to reward Monegasque musicians.

Classical music
The Monte Carlo Philharmonic Orchestra was founded in 1863 and gained a permanent home at Salle Garnier in 1879. The Orchestra is quite prominent in the classical world, and has been conducted by Igor Markevitch, Lovro von Matačić, Paul Paray, Lawrence Foster, Gianluigi Gelmetti and Louis Frémaux.

The Little Singers of Monaco are a children's choir founded in 1973, when the Palatine Chapel's Chapel Master, Philippe Debat, was ordered by the government to send a choir of children around the world. This practice carries on a tradition from the reign of Prince Antoine I, during whose rule a children's choir sang the liturgies in the Palatine Chapel.

Popular music

Eurovision success
Monaco participated regularly in the Eurovision Song Contest between 1959–1979 and 2004–2006. The country's only win in the contest came in 1971 when Séverine performed "Un banc, un arbre, une rue". None of the artists participating for Monaco was originally Monegasque, but French-born Minouche Barelli, who represented Monaco in 1967, shared her time between Paris and Monaco, acquired Monegasque citizenship in 2002, and died in the principality on 20 February 2004 at the age of 56.

Notable artists
The Franco-Monegasque singer-songwriter Léo Ferré was born in Monaco.

References